Sairocarpus nuttallianus, commonly known as Nuttall's snapdragon or violet snapdragon, is a species of New World snapdragon.

It is native to southern California and Baja California, where it can be found from the immediate coastline to the inland coastal ranges.

Description
Sairocarpus nuttallianus is an annual or biennial herb producing an erect, vinelike stem which sometimes clings to objects for support, but does not twine as tightly as many other snapdragons.

The flowers are veined light purple with white patches and around a centimeter long. Each is borne on a short pedicel.

See also
California chaparral and woodlands
Flora of the California chaparral and woodlands

External links
Jepson Manual Treatment
USDA Plants Profile
Photo gallery

Flora of California
Flora of Baja California
Natural history of the California chaparral and woodlands
Natural history of the Peninsular Ranges
Flora without expected TNC conservation status
Plantaginaceae